María del Mar is a Venezuelan telenovela produced by Venevisión in 1978. An original story by veteran telenovela writer Delia Fiallo, it starred Chelo Rodríguez and Arnaldo André as the main protagonists with Hilda Carrero and Martín Lantigua as the antagonists.

Plot
In a village along the coast of Venezuela lives  Maria Celeste, a girl with big dreams who is very cheerful and rebellious. She has been raised up by a kind family of fishermen, since she is the product of a rape, and her mother went mad after her delivery. during one summer, the mighty Leonidas Parras Montiel returns to town with his daughters, the selfish engineer Walkiria and the shy Zulay. Also, another person returns to the village: engineer Victor Manuel Galindez, a handsome man who hides a tortuous past. After spending time with each other, Maria Celeste falls in love with Victor Manuel.

Leonidas wants to build a hotel and entrusts the project to Walkiria and Victor Manuel. Immediately they fall in love, but he is fascinated with Maria Celeste. Leonidas also falls in love with the humble girl and wants to make her his wife.
But everything will change when Victor Manuel rescues a beautiful and strange woman from the sea, a woman that the villagers  believe is a mermaid. In reality, she is Miriam, a woman who went insane after Leonidas and his family financially destroyed and burned her property, causing the death of her parents and her husband. Victor Manuel dedicates his time in helping this woman, and this causes Maria Celeste to become jealous. Again, a prestigious publisher named Daniel comes into town, and is marvelled at the exotic beauty of Maria Celeste. He offers to take her to the city to make her a model. She agrees and goes with him, adopting the stage name of Maria del Mar. In the city, Maria will fall in love and triumph in the capital, until she becomes paralyzed through an unfortunate accident.

Cast
 Chelo Rodríguez as María Celeste/María del Mar
 Arnaldo André as Víctor Manuel Galíndez
 Hilda Carrero as Walkiria Parra Montiel 
 Herminia Martínez as María y Miriam" 
 Betty Ruth as Casilda
 Martín Lantigua as Leónidas Parra Montiel
 Raúl Xiqués as Guillermo 
 Elluz Peraza as Liduvina
 Flor Núñez as Inocencia
 Franklin Virgüez as Sargento Santos
 José Luis Silva as El Mojarras
 Elena Farias as Sulay Parra Montiel
 Héctor Myerston as Daniel 
 Ángel Acosta as Salvador
 Angie as Federica Martínez
 Hermelinda Alvarado 
 Haydée Balza as  Mercedes Alcalá
 Chela d Gar as Mística
 Alma Ingianni as Lucrecia
 Mirtha Pérez as Maruja
 Chumico Romero
 Omar Omaña as Doctor Leonardo
 Luis Augusto Romero as  Tilico
 Carmencita Padrón as  Ramona
 Yalitza Hernández as  Abril

Versions
 Mar de amor : a Mexican telenovela produced by Televisa in 2009 starring Zuria Vega and Mario Cimarro.

References

External links
 

Venevisión telenovelas
1978 telenovelas
Venezuelan telenovelas
1978 Venezuelan television series debuts
1978 Venezuelan television series endings
Spanish-language telenovelas
Television shows set in Venezuela